Stephen Redding is a British-American economist, focusing in international trade and economic geography and productivity and economic growth, currently the Harold T. Shapiro *64 Professor in Economics at Princeton University.

He is a fellow of the Econometric Society.

References

External links

Year of birth missing (living people)
Living people
Princeton University faculty
American economists
British economists
Fellows of the Econometric Society